The General Society of Mayflower Descendants — commonly called the Mayflower Society — is a hereditary organization of individuals who have documented their descent from at least one of the 102 passengers who arrived on the Mayflower in 1620 at what is now Plymouth, Massachusetts. The Society was founded at Plymouth in 1897.

Organization 
A primary goal of the Society is to educate the public about the role of the Pilgrims in the early history of what would later become the United States of America.  There are Mayflower societies in all 50 United States, the District of Columbia, and Canada. 

Today, it is estimated that up to tens of millions of Americans have at least one ancestor who was among this group of early settlers. Any person able to document their descent from one or more of the Mayflower Pilgrims is eligible to apply for membership in the Mayflower Society.  The General Society of Mayflower Descendants is listed as an approved lineage society with the Hereditary Society Community of the United States of America.

List of Pilgrims with known descendants 

This is a list of Mayflower Pilgrims who are known to have living descendants:

 John Alden
 Priscilla (Mullins) Alden
 Bartholomew Allerton
 Isaac Allerton
 Mary (Norris) Allerton
 Mary (Allerton) Cushman
 Remember (Allerton) Maverick
 Elinor Billington
 Francis Billington
 John Billington
 William Bradford
 Love Brewster
 Mary Brewster
 William Brewster
 Peter Browne
 James Chilton 
 Mrs. Chilton (wife of James)
 Mary (Chilton) Winslow
 Francis Cooke
 John Cooke
 Edward Doty
 Francis Eaton
 Samuel Eaton
 Sarah Eaton
 Moses Fletcher
 Edward Fuller
 Mrs. Fuller (wife of Edward)
 Samuel Fuller (son of Edward)
 Samuel Fuller (brother of Edward)
 Constance (Hopkins) Snow
 Giles Hopkins
 Stephen Hopkins
 Elizabeth (Fisher) Hopkins
 John Howland
 Richard More
 William Mullins
 Degory Priest
 Joseph Rogers
 Thomas Rogers
 Henry Samson
 George Soule
 Myles Standish
 Elizabeth (Tilley) Howland
 John Tilley
 Joan (Hurst) Tilley
 Richard Warren
 Peregrine White
 Resolved White
 Susanna (Jackson) White Winslow
 William White
 Edward Winslow

Museum 

In 1941 the Society purchased the Edward Winslow House in Plymouth, Massachusetts. The mansion home was originally built in 1754 by the great-grandson of Edward Winslow, third Governor of Plymouth Colony.  The Society operates the home as the Mayflower House Museum, an 18th-century historic house museum with period decorations and furnishings.  The offices and library of the General Society of Mayflower Descendants are located behind the mansion.

See also 
 List of Mayflower passengers

Notes

External links 
 
 A Guide to the Society of Mayflower Descendants in the State of Texas Records, University of Texas at San Antonio Libraries (UTSA Libraries) Special Collections.
 The Mayflower Pub London The original mooring point of the Pilgrim Fathers’ Mayflower ship in Rotherhithe, London and the oldest pub on the River Thames
The Hereditary Society Community of the United States of America

Lineage societies
The Mayflower Society
Organizations established in 1897
Migration-related organizations based in the United States
Mayflower
1897 establishments in Massachusetts